Dustin Hogue (born June 30, 1992) is an American professional basketball player for Promitheas Patras of the Greek Basket League and the EuroCup. He played college basketball for Indian Hills Community College and Iowa State Cyclones. Hogue entered the 2015 NBA draft, but was not selected in the draft's two rounds.

High school career
Hogue played high school basketball at Lincoln in Yonkers, New York. He was ranked as the No. 208 player in New York.

College career

Indian Hills 
Hogue chose to play college basketball for Indian Hils college after finishing highschool at Lincoln High School. As a sophomore, he averaged 12.9 points and 5.4 rebounds in 25 games making 49.4 percent of his shots from the field. He was named in the Second-Team All-Region XI.  His team went 24–1 in the 25 games he appeared in. As a freshman, he averaged 10.6 points and 5.7 rebounds. Indian Hils finished seventh at the NJCAA Division I national tournament in 2012.

Iowa State 
As a junior, he was transferred from Indian Hills, to Iowa State University. In his first season, he played and started at all 36 games averaging 11.6 points and 8.4 rebounds being the second in the Big 12 in rebounding. Houge shot 57.3 percent from the field, including 34.4 percent from behind the arc. He was named to the NCAA Tournament All-East Region Team after scoring a career-high 34 points against Connecticut in the Sweet 16. He had his first career double-double came against No. 7 Michigan when he scored 12 points and grabbed 10 rebounds. In the 2014–15 season
his numbers dipped to 9.3 points and 4.9 rebounds, but he averaged four fewer minutes of playing time. He did, however, improve his 3-point shooting during his last season from 34 percent to 43 percent. He scored in double figures 16 times this season and 37 times in his career.

College statistics 

|-
| style="text-align:left;"| 2013–14
| style="text-align:left;"| Iowa State
| 36 || 36 || 29.9 || .573 || .344 || .664 || 8.4 || 1.0 || .8 || .6 || 11.6
|-
| style="text-align:left;"| 2014–15
| style="text-align:left;"| Iowa State
| 34 || 34 || 26.2 || .557 || .431 || .550 || 4.9 || 1.1 || .7 || .3 || 9.3
|-
| style="text-align:left;"| Career
| style="text-align:left;"| 
| 70 || 70 || 28.1 || .556 || .388 || .617 || 6.7 || 1.1 || .7 || .4 || 10.5

Professional career
After going undrafted in the 2015 NBA draft, Hogue signed with the Greek club Nea Kifissia for the 2015–16 Greek Basket League season. At the end of the full season, Hogue went on to average 12.5 points, 8.1 rebounds, 1.4 assists, and 0.9 steals in 28 games for Kifissia. He was the top rebounder of the Greek Basket League's regular season phase. During the season, Hogue scored in double figures 20 times, having also 11 double-doubles in points and rebounds.

On June 29, 2016, Hogue signed with Aquila Basket Trento for the 2016–17 season.

In July 2017, Hogue signed with Korean club Goyang Orion Orions.

In July 2017, Hogue signed with Turkish club Pınar Karşıyaka.

In November 2017, Hogue signed with Italian club Orlandina Basket. However Orlandina Basket was unable to finalize the deal with him. According to a decision taken by FIBA, Hogue was still bound with the South Korean team of Goyang Orion Orions, so he could not be registered with another organization.

On December 14, 2017, Hogue signed again with Italian club Aquila Basket Trento.

On July 29, 2019, he signed a contract with BC Enisey of the VTB United League. Hogue averaged 11 points and 6 rebounds per game. He re-signed with BC Enisey on July 16, 2020.

On July 22, 2021, he has signed with Cluj of the Romanian Liga Națională.

On July 1, 2022, he has signed with Prometey of the Latvian-Estonian Basketball League.

On January 9, 2023, Hogue signed with Greek club Promitheas Patras for the rest of the season.

Personal
Dustin is the son of Douglas and Alicia Hogue. His brother Doug Hogue played as a linebacker for the NFL's Detroit Lions, Carolina Panthers and Winnipeg Blue Bombers.

His nickname is The Hines-like, due to his similar characteristics with Kyle Hines.

Career statistics

Domestic Leagues

Full season

|-
| 2015–16
| style="text-align:left;"| Nea Kifissia
| align=left | GBL
| 28 ||  || 30.5 || .489 || .273 || .660 || 8.1 || 1.4 || 1.0 || 0.1 || 12.5
|-
|}

References

External links
Profile at legabasket.it
Twitter Account
Profile at eurobasket.com 
Profile at esake.gr
Profile at realgm.com 
Profile at draftexpress.com
Profile at nbadraft.net 
College Profile at espn.com

1992 births
Living people
American expatriate basketball people in Greece
American expatriate basketball people in Italy
American expatriate basketball people in Romania
American expatriate basketball people in Russia
American expatriate basketball people in South Korea
American expatriate basketball people in Ukraine
American men's basketball players
Aquila Basket Trento players
Basketball players from New York (state)
BC Enisey players
BC Prometey players
Centers (basketball)
Goyang Carrot Jumpers players
Orlandina Basket players
Indian Hills Warriors basketball players
Iowa State Cyclones men's basketball players
Lega Basket Serie A players
Nea Kifissia B.C. players
Power forwards (basketball)
Promitheas Patras B.C. players
Sportspeople from Yonkers, New York